In mathematics, the study of special values of -functions is a subfield of number theory devoted to generalising formulae such as the Leibniz formula for pi, namely

by the recognition that expression on the left-hand side is also  where  is the Dirichlet -function for the field of Gaussian rational numbers. This formula is a special case of the analytic class number formula, and in those terms reads that the Gaussian field has class number 1. The factor  on the right hand side of the formula corresponds to the fact that this field contains four roots of unity.

Conjectures
There are two families of conjectures, formulated for general classes of -functions (the very general setting being for -functions associated to Chow motives over number fields), the division into two reflecting the questions of:
 how to replace  in the Leibniz formula by some other "transcendental" number (regardless of whether it is currently possible for transcendental number theory to provide a proof of the transcendence); and
 how to generalise the rational factor in the formula (class number divided by number of roots of unity) by some algebraic construction of a rational number that will represent the ratio of the -function value to the "transcendental" factor.

The conjectures for (a) are called Beilinson's conjectures, for Alexander Beilinson. The idea is to abstract from the regulator of a number field to some "higher regulator" (the Beilinson regulator), a determinant constructed on a real vector space that comes from algebraic K-theory.

The conjectures for (b) are called the Bloch–Kato conjectures for special values (for Spencer Bloch and Kazuya Kato; this circle of ideas is distinct from the Bloch–Kato conjecture of K-theory, extending the Milnor conjecture, a proof of which was announced in 2009). For the sake of greater clarity, they are also called the Tamagawa number conjecture, a name arising via the Birch–Swinnerton-Dyer conjecture and its formulation as an elliptic curve analogue of the Tamagawa number problem for linear algebraic groups. In a further extension, the equivariant Tamagawa number conjecture (ETNC) has been formulated, to consolidate the connection of these ideas with Iwasawa theory, and its so-called Main Conjecture.

Current status
All of these conjectures are known to be true only in special cases.

See also
Brumer–Stark conjecture

Notes

References

External links
 L-funktionen und die Vermutingen von Deligne und Beilinson (L-functions and the conjectures of Deligne and Beilsnson)

Zeta and L-functions